Xinglongtai District is a district under the administration of the city of Panjin, Liaoning province, People's Republic of China. The district's postal code is 124010, and the district government is located on Shiyou Street.

Administrative divisions

Xinglongtai District administers 18 subdistricts:

Zhenxing Subdistrict, Xinglong Subdistrict, Bohai Subdistrict, Xingong Subdistrict, Yulou Subdistrict, Gaosheng Subdistrict, Shuguang Subdistrict, Youyi Subdistrict, Hongcun Subdistrict, Ping'an Subdistrict, Xinsheng Subdistrict, Huanxi Subdistrict, Shencai Subdistrict, Cicai Subdistrict, Jincai Subdistrict, Xinghai Subdistrict, Xingsheng Subdistrict, Chuangxin Subdistrict

References

External links

County-level divisions of Liaoning
Panjin